1,000 Yard Stare is the debut album from Atlanta rock band doubleDrive, released in 1999 on MCA Records. The album produced one single, "Tattooed Bruise", which peaked at No. 22 on the US Mainstream Rock chart.
The band included a cover of "Mexican Radio" as a hidden track.

Track listing
"Belief System"
"Dressed in Light"
"1000 Yard Stare" (co-written by Sevendust guitarist Clint Lowery)
"Hell"
"Smaller" 
"Vamp"
"Sacrifice" (co-written lyrics by Corey Lowery)
"Gone"
"Tattooed Bruise"
"Reason"
"Stand By" (lyrics co-written by Dustin Lowery)
"Mexican Radio" (Wall of Voodoo cover)

References

1999 debut albums
DoubleDrive albums